Derpowangsan is a populated place in Magelang Regency, Central Java, Indonesia.

See also
Mount Merbabu
Mount Telomoyo

References

Villages in Central Java